Bob Clifford (born 6 March 1937) is  a former Australian rules footballer who played with Richmond in the Victorian Football League (VFL).

Notes

External links 
		

Living people
1937 births
Australian rules footballers from South Australia
Richmond Football Club players